Leriche is a French-language surname. It may refer to:

 Chloé Leriche, Canadian film director from Quebec
 Guillaume Leriche (born 1975), French sound engineer
 René Leriche (1879-1955), French vascular surgeon and physiologist
 Samantha Leriche-Gionet (born 1985), Canadian animator, illustrator, and comic strip author

Surnames of French origin